Hackås IF is a sports club in Hackås, Sweden, established in 1935. The women's bandy team has played two seasons in the Swedish top division. The women's soccer team played four seasons in the Swedish top division between 1978 and 1981.

References

External links
Official website 

1935 establishments in Sweden
Association football clubs established in 1935
Bandy clubs established in 1935
Football clubs in Jämtland County
Defunct bandy clubs in Sweden
Sport in Jämtland County